The Whitbread 60 (W60), later known as the Volvo Ocean 60 (VO60), was a class of ocean racing yacht built to a "box rule" specifying key design parameters of the 10 smaller yachts which took part the 1993–94 Whitbread Round the World Race.

The class raced with such success that the following race was restricted to Whitbread 60s only. Its design was used for the last time in the 2001–02 Volvo Ocean Race, replaced thereafter by the sophisticated, canting keel Volvo Open 70, built to a new box rule.

Box Rule specifications

Yachts
A total of 32 Volvo Ocean 60s were built for the three editions the class was used by the race. 28 of these competed in the race with 4 boats being built as training boats for two boat testing although race organizers tried to discourage this.

Designers

Comparison of Ocean 60 and Open 70

References

External links
Volvo Ocean Race  – Official site
Volvo Ocean Race TV – Official Web TV site
Andrews 60 – A W60 design detail
speedsailing –  V.O.60 ILLBRUCK history and boat details

 
Sailing yachts

Development sailing classes
Box rule sailing classes